Gopaul Sahadeo (born 18 March 1952) is a Trinidadian cricketer. He played in two first-class matches for Trinidad and Tobago in 1973/74 and 1976/77.

See also
 List of Trinidadian representative cricketers

References

External links
 

1952 births
Living people
Trinidad and Tobago cricketers